Calum Waters (born 31 August 1996) is an English professional rugby union player for the RFU Championship side Hartpury University. He plays Scrum-half.

Club career
Waters played regular first team rugby in the 2014/15 season for Worthing Raiders in National Two South, scoring on 13 occasions, before signing for Harlequins in May 2015.

In August 2016, Waters captained the Harlequins squad at the Singha Sevens.

On 12 March 2017, Waters made his senior debut for the Quins as a replacement and scored a try in the Anglo-Welsh Cup match against Exeter Chiefs. Later that month, the young scrum-half re-signed with Harlequins.

International career
Waters was named as part of the England U20 squad for the 2016 Six Nations Under 20s Championship whereby he played against Wales at the Bristols' Ashton Gate.

References

External links
Harlequins profile
ESPN profile
Statbunker profile

1996 births
Living people
English rugby union players
Esher RFC players
Harlequin F.C. players
Jersey Reds players
Rugby union players from Brighton
Rugby union scrum-halves